Rae Desmond Jones (11 August 1941 – 27 June 2017) was an Australian poet, novelist, short story writer and politician.

Jones was born in the mining town of Broken Hill in the far West of New South Wales. Although many of his poems and stories are concerned with urban experience, he always felt that desert landscapes were central to his language and perception. He wrote in colloquial language, which sometimes exploded in powerful narratives packed with ambiguous sexual and violent imagery, especially in his earlier poems and some of his novels.

He was involved with the Poets Union. 

He became a popular mayor of Ashfield, an inner Sydney Municipality, from 2004 to 2006, and during that period held together a broad coalition of Labor Party, Green and Independent representatives. He said that for him "poetry and politics are mutually contradictory, and he finds consolation from each in the arms of the other."

Bibliography
Poetry
 Orpheus With A Tuba, Makar Press, 1973.
 The Mad Vibe, Saturday Centre, 1975.
 Shakti, Makar Press, 1977.
 The Palace of Art, Makar Press, 1981.
 Blow Out, Island Press, 2008.
 Baygone and other poems, Picaro Press, 2011.
 Thirteen Poems from the Dead, Polar Bear Press 2011.
 Decline and Fall, Flying Islands Press, 2011.
 The Selected Your Friendly Fascist, (as editor), Rochford Press, 2012.
 It Comes From All Directions: New and Selected Poems, Grand Parade Poets, 2013.
 The End of the Line, Rochford Press, 2019.

Novels
 The Lemon Tree, Angus & Robertson, 1990.
 Wisdom, Blackwattle Press, 1995.

Short stories
 Walking The Line, Red Press, 1979.

Video/DVD
 Rae Jones: Poet With A Tuba, Vanguard 1985.

External links
Author Page at Australian Literary Resources
Interview at Stylus Poetry
note left under a magnet on a fridge door in a field Poem
Review of Blow Out
Review of Thirteen Poems for the Dead

References

 "The Mad Vibe - An Interview With Rae Desmond Jones", Makar Magazine, Vol 10, Number 2, September 1974.
 "The Shield of Achilles", Southerly Vol. 65 Number 3. 2005.

1941 births
2017 deaths
20th-century Australian novelists
Australian male novelists
20th-century Australian poets
Australian male short story writers
Mayors of Ashfield
Writers from Sydney
Australian male poets
21st-century Australian poets
20th-century Australian short story writers
21st-century Australian short story writers
20th-century Australian male writers
21st-century Australian male writers
Politicians from Sydney